Rosswood is a historic Southern plantation located off of Mississippi Highway 552, in Lorman, Jefferson County, Mississippi, USA. It was listed on the National Register of Historic Places in 1978.

It is also a Mississippi Landmark.

History
It was built as a cotton plantation for Dr Walter Ross Wade (1810–1862) and his wife Mabella Chamberlain.  The architectural style of the plantation house is Greek Revival.

Before the American Civil War, Wade and his wife held parties and balls and entertained guests. The property spanned  and had 105 slaves. It is now only . During the  Civil War, it was used as a hospital for the Confederate States Army.

In 1975, Colonel Walt Hylander and his wife Jean purchased the plantation and restored it. It was opened to the public as a house museum, and used for weddings and special occasions. In March 2019, Rosswood permanently closed to the public and is now a private residence.

See also 
 Prospect Hill Plantation

References

Houses on the National Register of Historic Places in Mississippi
Houses in Jefferson County, Mississippi
Greek Revival houses in Mississippi
Plantation houses in Mississippi
National Register of Historic Places in Jefferson County, Mississippi
Slave cabins and quarters in the United States
Cotton plantations in Mississippi